The 2018–19 Idaho Vandals women's basketball team represents the University of Idaho during the 2018–19 NCAA Division I women's basketball season. The Vandals, led by eleventh year head coach Jon Newlee, play their home games at the Cowan Spectrum with early season games at Memorial Gym, and are members of the Big Sky Conference. They finished the season 22–12, 16–4 in Big Sky play to win the Big Sky regular season championship. They advanced to the semifinals of the Big Sky women's tournament where they lost to Portland State. They received an automatic bid to the Women's National Invitation Tournament where defeated Loyola Marymount and Denver in the first and second rounds before losing to Arizona in the third round.

Roster

Schedule

|-
!colspan=9 style=| Exhibition

|-
!colspan=9 style=| Non-conference regular season

|-
!colspan=9 style=| Big Sky regular season

|-
!colspan=9 style=| Big Sky Women's Tournament

|-
!colspan=9 style=| WNIT

See also
 2018–19 Idaho Vandals men's basketball team

References

Idaho Vandals women's basketball seasons
Idaho
Van
Van
Idaho